"All This Love" is a single by DeBarge, released on October 17, 1982. The song was released as the third and final single from their second studio album of the same title on the Gordy label. The single would help DeBarge rise to R&B stardom. A cover version of the song was recorded by Patti LaBelle on her 1994 gold album Gems. A video for her version was also filmed.

Overview

History
In 1982, having released one album that did not go anywhere, DeBarge went into recording their follow-up with their own songs, chiefly handled by El DeBarge, who was also the main lead singer and focal point of the group, including the song, "All This Love", in which DeBarge sung in a high tenor and had written it in a year earlier in hopes then-label mate and longtime idol Marvin Gaye would record it.

Gaye had served as El's inspiration for the song, hinted in the group's vocal harmonizing in the final part of the song, which was similar to Gaye's "I Want You" vocal style period. By the following year, Gaye had left the label and DeBarge ended up recording it themselves. Producing this song with Berry Gordy's niece Iris, the single was issued as the third release from All This Love.

The song was featured in a 1983 episode of the US daytime soap opera Days of Our Lives.

Reception
Much like their first hit, "I Like It", "All This Love" was immediately embraced by the R&B community while the group gained a pop fan base. In the US, The single reached number 5 on the Billboard R&B chart, number 17 on the Billboard Hot 100,  and number one on the Adult Contemporary chart, helping its parent album of the same name reach gold status by the summer of 1983.

Personnel
 Lead vocals, keyboards and rhythm arrangement - El DeBarge
 Background vocals - DeBarge
 Keyboards - James DeBarge
 Guitar solo - José Feliciano
 Drums - Ricky Lawson
 Bass -  Freddie Washington
 Percussion by Nathan Hughes and Richard Heath
 Guitars - Charles F. Fearing, Curtis A. Nolen, and Robben Ford
 Rhythm, string and horn arrangements by Benjamin F. Wright, Jr.
 Horns - Clarence Lawrey, George Bohanon, John Ervin, Cliff Ervin, Nolan A. Smith, Jr., Raymond L. Brown, Roy Poper and Mark DeBarge
 Flute by Gerald A. Albright
 Produced by El DeBarge and Iris Gordy
 Written by El DeBarge 
 Engineering - Barney Perkins
 Executive Producer - Berry Gordy

Cover versions
 It was covered by American jazz violinist John Blake on his 1987 album Adventures of the Heart with vocals by Gwen Guthrie.
 Pop group Scene 23 from the WB show Popstars recorded a version on the song for their debut album, Introducing Scene 23.
 Detroit-based guitarist Calvin Brooks recorded an instrumental version of it on his 1992 album My Favorite Thing.
 The song was re-recorded by R&B legend Patti LaBelle on her 1994 album, Gems. LaBelle's version, produced by Teddy Riley, was released as a single and peaked at #42 on the Billboard R&B chart. DeBarge and LaBelle later sung the song together as a duet live in concert.
 Mexican-American percussionist Pete Escovedo, along with saxophonist Gerald Albright did an instrumental version of "All This Love" for Escovedo's 1995 album Flying South, which had considerable air time on smooth jazz radio stations.
 In 1996 R&B group Xscape covered the song on the American police drama New York Undercover episode 44 "Sympathy for the Devil" and it also appears on the 1998 soundtrack for the show.
 Los Angeles-based singer/songwriter Bill Cantos recorded a Latin jazz-oriented version on his 2000 album Movie in the Night Sky.
 The song was covered by Boyz II Men and released on their 2007 compilation album Motown: A Journey Through Hitsville USA of Motown hits.
 Johnny Mathis covered the song on his 2008 album, A Night to Remember.

Samples
 West side rapper Skee-lo sampled "All This Love" in the "I Wish (Street Mix)" remix of his hit song "I Wish" from his 1995 debut album I Wish.
 In 1996, Rapper Da Brat sampled the track for "Ghetto Love" on her second album Anuthatantrum.
 In 1996, Tha Mexakinz sampled the track for "Problems" on their second album Tha Mexakinz.
 Tionne Watkins (a.k.a. T-Boz) of TLC sung an interpolation of the first verse of the "Debarge" track as the opening and the same chorus.
 In 2000, Master P sampled the beat for the song "Life I Live" featuring Short Circuit & Slay Sean off his album Ghetto Postage.
 In 2001, AZ (rapper) sampled the track for his song called "Problems" off his album 9 Lives.
 In 2004, Angie Stone sang an interpolation of the outro as the chorus to her song "I Wanna Thank Ya" from her album Stone Love.

Charts

Weekly charts

Year-end charts

See also
 List of number-one adult contemporary singles of 1983 (U.S.)

References

1983 singles
1994 singles
DeBarge songs
Patti LaBelle songs
Songs written by El DeBarge
1982 songs
Gordy Records singles
Contemporary R&B ballads
Soul ballads
1980s ballads